"Nothing Lasts Forever" is a song by American pop rock band Maroon 5 from the group's second studio album, It Won't Be Soon Before Long (2007). Although not being released as a single, "Nothing Lasts Forever" charted at number 23 on the Billboard Bubbling Under Hot 100 chart. It was written by band frontman Adam Levine, with production of the song helmed by  Mike Elizondo, Mark "Spike" Stent and Maroon 5.

The chorus of the song was first used in Kanye West's song, Heard 'Em Say, which features Levine.

Background

Writing
Band frontman Adam Levine and rapper Kanye West developed a friendship sitting together on a flight to Rome for the 2004 MTV Europe Music Awards. During the flight, West showed Levine an early version of his song Heard 'Em Say. As Levine recalled, "He was rhyming over [the track], and I had just written a hook that was so perfect for it. It was one of those natural collaborations where you're so excited because it's all very pure and very easy."
While writing for "It Won't Be Soon Before Long", Levine decided to use the chorus he wrote for "Heard 'Em Say" for a new song he was working on, "Nothing Lasts Forever". 

The chorus of the song features Levine gently crooning in a falsetto.

Live
The first time the song was played live, Kanye West came on stage and performed part of "Heard 'Em Say". On October 10, while Maroon 5 was playing "Nothing Lasts Forever" at a sold-out concert inside Madison Square Garden in NYC, singer Adam Levine announced that he was to introduce "a good friend" to the stage, followed by a surprise guest appearance from West. To the delight of the audience, the two segued into a live rendition of "Heard 'Em Say". Although "Nothing Lasts Forever" wasn't played live many times, during the few performances of the song, it was usually played with West.

Other appearances
Nothing Lasts Forever is featured on the television series The Hills and a in the 2008 film Definitely, Maybe.

Charts

Credits and personnel 
All credits adapted from the parent album's liner notes.
Maroon 5
 Adam Levine – lead and backing vocals, rhythm guitar
 Jesse Carmichael – keyboards, backing vocals
 Mickey Madden – bass guitar
 James Valentine – lead and rhythm guitars, backing vocals
 Matt Flynn – drums, percussion

Production
 Ryan Dusick – musical director
 Mike Elizondo – production, additional keyboards
 Mark "Spike" Stent - production, mixing
 Adam Hawkins - Pro-Tools engineer 
 Eric "Dream" Weaver - assistant engineer 
 Jay Goin - assistant engineer 
 Alex Dromgoole - mix assistant 
 David Emery - mix assistant

References

2007 songs
Maroon 5 songs
Songs written by Adam Levine
A&M Octone Records singles
Song recordings produced by Mike Elizondo